Tom Rogerson is a British musician. He is the founder of Three Trapped Tigers and has also made music with others, such as Finding Shore (2017) with Brian Eno.

Career
Rogerson is from Suffolk. He studied at the Royal Academy of Music in London and lived for a time in New York City, where he played jazz with Reid Anderson. He is the founder of Three Trapped Tigers, in which he sings and plays piano and keyboards. The Suffolk landscape inspired Finding Shore, on which Rogerson plays improvised piano.

Discography

Solo
 Piano and Voice (1999)
 For Mannie: Live at the Pumphouse (2003)
 Tom Rogerson (2005) – with Reid Anderson, Michael Lewis, Christian Hebel and Michael Spyro
 Live at the Luminaire (2006)
 Retreat to Bliss (2022)

With Three Trapped Tigers

Route One or Die (Blood and Biscuits, 2011)
Numbers: 1-13 (Blood and Biscuits, 2012)
Silent Earthling (Superball, 2016)

With others
Cable Street Shorts (Loop, 2010) – with Tomas Challenger
Finding Shore (Dead Oceans, 2017) – with Brian Eno

With contributions by Rogerson
First Love (Close Harbour, 2009) by Emmy the Great – co-producer
Five American Portraits (Drag City, 2010) by Red Krayola and Art & Language – Rogerson plays piano

References

External links

"Finding Shore - A Conversation with Tom Rogerson and Brian Eno" on YouTube (video)

Alumni of the Royal Academy of Music
Musicians from Suffolk
Date of birth missing (living people)
Place of birth missing (living people)
Living people
Year of birth missing (living people)